Muzeum Historii Polskiego Ruchu Ludowego is a museum in Warsaw, Poland. It was established in 1984.  The museum is located in a building known as the ‘Yellow Tavern’ („Żółta Karczma”).  Its focus is the history of the Polish countryside, peasant political parties and other groups.  It does not have a permanent collection but offers a range of changing exhibitions.

References

External links
 
 

Museums in Warsaw
Museums established in 1984
History museums in Poland
Registered museums in Poland